The Marussia F2 is a full-size luxury SUV designed and made by Marussia Motors and Valmet Automotive according to Marussia, it can be used as a mobile command center, as a military vehicle or as an emergency vehicle. The concept car was shown on May 2, 2010. The Marussia F2 model was scheduled to have 300 units made in 2012 by Valmet Automotive.

Overview
The Marussia F2 is a concept car with a 5-door SUV body styling with 4 seats. Its doors have a manner in conventional front doors and power sliding doors (used on the Bertone Genesis) as its doors are similar to the Bertone Genesis. The Marussia F2 is the first and only car in the full-size luxury SUV class to have power sliding doors.

References

Marussia Motors
Cars introduced in 2010
All-wheel-drive vehicles
Full-size sport utility vehicles
Luxury sport utility vehicles